The Haukar men's football team is the men's football department of the Haukar multi-sport club. It is based in Hafnarfjörður, Iceland, and currently plays in the 1. deild karla, the second-tier men's football league in Iceland. In 2010, the team was promoted to the top-tier Úrvalsdeild karla for the first time in 31 years. They finished second to last in the league during the 2010 season and were relegated back to 1. deild karla. On May 16, 2012, Haukar defeated Snæfell 31-0 in the Icelandic Football Cup.

Current squad

Honors
2. deild karla
 Winners (2): 2001, 2007

3. deild karla
 Winners (2): 1989, 2000

References

External links
 Haukar Football Official Website
 2018 Club profile at ksi.is

Football clubs in Iceland